Pietrapertosa is a town and comune in the province of Potenza, in the Southern Italian region of Basilicata. It is bounded by the comuni of Accettura, Albano di Lucania, Campomaggiore, Castelmezzano, Cirigliano, Corleto Perticara, Gorgoglione and Laurenzana.

Pietrapertosa is part of I Borghi più Belli d'Italia (The most beautiful villages in Italy), an Italian association that notes small towns of strong artistic and historical interest. The association includes 200 comuni, including four others in Basilicata (Acerenza, Castelmezzano, Guardia Perticara and Venosa), all in the province of Potenza.

In 2019, CNN included Pietrapertosa among "20 of the most beautiful villages in Italy".

It was the lifelong home of Lucia Lauria Vigna, the oldest person in Italy for almost two and a half years.

Pietrapertosa is also home of one of the longest and highest zip lines in the world: Volo dell'Angelo (Angel Flight). This zip line goes mountain peak to mountain between the adjoining towns of Pietrapertosa and Castelmezzano.

References

Cities and towns in Basilicata